is a Japanese football player. He plays for Yokohama FC from 2023.

Club career
Kyohei Yoshino joined to Tokyo Verdy in 2013. 

In August 2014, he moved to Sanfrecce Hiroshima. 

In July 2016, he moved to Kyoto Sanga FC.

In 2020,  he returned to his hometown club Vegalta Sendai.

In 2022, he joined to J1 promotion club, Yokohama FC for upcoming 2023 season.

Career statistics
.

Club

1Includes Japanese Super Cup and Promotion Playoffs to J1.

International 

 Japan national under-16 football team
 2010 AFC U-16 Championship（3rd place）
 Japan national under-17 football team
 2011 International Youth Soccer in Niigata（Runner-up）
 Japan national under-18 football team
 2012 slovak cup（6th place）
 Japan national under-19 football team
 2013 Alcudia International Youth Soccer Tournament（Group league）
 Japan national under-21 football team
 2014 2013 AFC U-22 Championship、Asian games soccer competition
 Japan national under-23 football team

References

External links
Profile at Sanfrecce Hiroshima
Profile at Kyoto Sanga
Profile at Vegalta Sendai

1994 births
Living people
Association football people from Miyagi Prefecture
Japanese footballers
J1 League players
J2 League players
J3 League players
Tokyo Verdy players
Sanfrecce Hiroshima players
Kyoto Sanga FC players
J.League U-22 Selection players
Vegalta Sendai players
Association football defenders
Footballers at the 2014 Asian Games
Asian Games competitors for Japan